
Gmina Ułęż is a rural gmina (administrative district) in Ryki County, Lublin Voivodeship, in eastern Poland.

Villages
Gmina Ułęż contains the villages and settlements of Białki Dolne, Białki Górne, Drążgów, Korzeniów, Lendo Ruskie, Podlodów, Podlodówka, Sarny, Sobieszyn, Ułęż, Żabianka and Zosin.

Neighbouring gminas
Gmina Ułęż is bordered by the gminas of Adamów, Baranów, Jeziorzany, Nowodwór, Ryki and Żyrzyn.

References
Polish official population figures 2006

Ulez
Ryki County